The 2001 Nokia Brier, Canada's national men's curling championship, was held March 3–11 at the Ottawa Civic Centre in Ottawa, Ontario. It was the very first Brier to be sponsored by Nokia. The theme of the event was the 2001: A Space Odyssey. In the finals, Team Alberta, consisting of skip Randy Ferbey, fourth David Nedohin, second Scott Pfeifer and lead Marcel Rocque would capture their first of four Brier wins as a team. They edged out Team Manitoba skipped by Kerry Burtnyk in the final, 8–4. While the Brier was not unsuccessful, it did end up losing money.  The total attendance was 154,136.

Teams
The 2001 Brier featured the 1981 and 1995 champion Kerry Burtnyk rink of Manitoba, 1982 and 1985 champion Al Hackner rink of Northern Ontario, 1998 champion Wayne Middaugh rink of Ontario, 1988 and 1989 champion third Randy Ferbey with his new Alberta rink, 1998 and 1999 runner-up Guy Hemmings rink of Quebec, 1990 runner-up Jim Sullivan rink of New Brunswick, 1999 Mixed champion Paul Flemming, 5-time PEI champion Peter MacDonald, 4-time territories champion Steve Moss, 2-time Saskatchewan champion Doug Harcourt along with newcomers 1989 Canadian Junior champion Dean Joanisse of BC, and Keith Ryan of Newfoundland.

Round-robin standings
Final round-robin standings

Round-robin results
All draw times are listed in Eastern Standard Time (UTC−5).

Draw 1
Saturday, March 3, 1:30 pm

Draw 2
Saturday, March 3, 7:00 pm

Draw 3
Sunday, March 4, 9:00 am

Draw 4
Sunday, March 4, 1:30 pm

Draw 5
Sunday, March 4, 7:30 pm

Draw 6
Monday, March 5, 9:00 am

Draw 7
Monday, March 5, 1:30 pm

Draw 8
Monday, March 5, 7:30 pm

Draw 9
Tuesday, March 6, 9:00 am

Draw 10
Tuesday, March 6, 1:30 pm

Draw 11
Tuesday, March 6, 7:30 pm

Draw 12
Wednesday, March 7, 9:00 am

Draw 13
Wednesday, March 7, 1:30 pm

Draw 14
Wednesday, March 7, 7:30 pm

Draw 15
Thursday, March 8, 9:00 am

Draw 16
Thursday, March 8, 1:30 pm

Draw 17
Thursday, March 8, 7:30 pm

Playoffs

1 vs. 2
Friday, March 9, 7:30 pm

3 vs. 4
Friday, March 9, 1:30 pm

Semifinal
Saturday, March 10, 1:30 pm

Final
Sunday, March 11, 1:30 pm

Statistics

Top 5 player percentages
Round robin only

Playdowns
: Team Nedohin, skipped by Randy Ferbey won the Alberta Safeway Select, defeating Kevin Martin 6–4 in the final at the Stettler Recreation Centre in Stettler on February 11. 
: Dean Joanisse of Victoria won the Safeway Select B.C. men's curling championship, defeating defending Brier champion Greg McAulay of New Westminster, 5–4 in the final at the McArthur Island Sports Centre in Kamloops on February 11. 
: Kerry Burtnyk (Assiniboine Memorial) won the Manitoba Safeway Select 10–7 over Dale Duguid (Granite) in the final at the Selkirk Recreation Complex in Selkirk on February 11. Duguid's last draw in the 10th came up short after picking on a piece of straw, giving the victory to Burtnyk.   
: Jim Sullivan of Saint John defeated Russ Howard of Moncton 6–5 in an extra end in the New Brunswick final played in Moncton. 
: Keith Ryan of Labrador City beat Ken Peddigrew of St. John's in the Newfoundland championship final, 5–4 in Stephenville.
: In an all-Thunder Bay final, the Al Hackner rink beat Team Bill Adams (skipped by Scott Henderson) 6–5 in an extra end at the Northern Ontario Labatt Tankard played at the North Bay Granite Club in North Bay on February 11. Hackner made a draw to the button for the win.   
: Paul Flemming defeated Ken Myers (both of Halifax) 9–7 in final of the Nova Scotia championship played in Sydney.
: Wayne Middaugh beat Stayner's John Morris, 4–3 in the final of the 2001 Ontario Nokia Cup played February 11 in Woodstock.   
: Peter MacDonald of Charlottetown won the Prince Edward Island Tankard on February 5. 
: Guy Hemmings downed François Roberge of Quebec City 7–2 in the Quebec final, played on February 10 in Chicoutimi. 
 Quill Lake's Doug Harcourt went 22–0 through playdown play, culminating in a 5–2 victory over Rocansville's Daryl Williamson in the final of the Pool Tankard played in Kindersley February 11. 
: Steve Moss of the Northwest Territories won the Yukon/NWT Men's Curling Championship played at the Mt. McIntyre Recreation Centre in Whitehorse, Yukon over the January 27–28 weekend. He posted a 5–1 record, two wins more than second place Jon Solberg of the Yukon.

References

Sources
CBC sports - 2001 Brier
Soudog's curling history site - 2001 Brier
Canadian Curling Association - 2001 Brier statistical summary
Curlingzone.com - 2001 Nokia Brier

Curling in Ottawa
The Brier
Nokia Brier
2001 in Ontario
2000s in Ottawa
March 2001 sports events in Canada